Alhaji Mukhtar Ramalan Yero (born 1 May 1968) is a Nigerian politician who served as the Kaduna State Commissioner of Finance from 2007 till May 2010 when Patrick Ibrahim Yakowa named him as the Deputy Governor after he succeeded Namadi Sambo who became the Vice President of Nigeria. In December 2012, he became Governor of Kaduna State after the death of Patrick Ibrahim Yakowa in a helicopter crash.

Background 

Alhaji Mukhtar Ramalan Yero was born on May 1, 1968, in Agwan Kaura in Zaria in Kaduna State. Yero had his early education at LEA Primary School, Kaura 1974-1980; Government Secondary School Ikara, 1980-1985; Government Secondary School, Zaria 1985-1986 before obtaining a Diploma in Banking from Ahmadu Bello University, Zaria. He also obtained B.Sc Accounting in 1991 before capping it with Masters in Business Administration.
A Certified Public Accountant (CPA), Yero started his career as Assistant accountant during his National Youth Service Corps at Ogun State Purchasing Corporation between 1991 and 1992. After the service he was employed as Higher Executive Officer Bursary Department at Ahmadu Bello University in 1993 before moving to Nigerian Universal Bank Limited as Accountant Supervisor the same year. In 1997, he joined a private firm, Nalado Nigerian Limited as Chief Accountant and rose in ranks to become Director Finance and Administration in 2007.

Political career 

After the election of Alhaji Namadi Sambo in 2007, he was appointed as the Commissioner of Finance from 2007 to May 2010. He was selected by Governor Patrick Ibrahim Yakowa to fill the vacant Deputy Governor seat in 2010.
In December 2012, he became the Governor of Kaduna State following the death of Patrick Ibrahim Yakowa in a helicopter crash in Bayelsa State.

In April 2015, he unsuccessfully ran  for re-election losing to opposition challenger Nasir Ahmad el-Rufai of the All Progressive Congress.

See also
List of Governors of Kaduna State

References

Governors of Kaduna State
1968 births
Living people
Nigerian politicians convicted of crimes
Politicians from Kaduna State
Candidates in the 2015 Nigerian general election